Cuspidata obscura is a species of moth of the family Tortricidae first described by Alexey Diakonoff in 1970. It is found on Madagascar.

References

Moths described in 1970
Archipini